Layton High School is a secondary school located in Layton, Utah, United States. Part of the Davis School District, Layton High School educates students in grades 10 to 12. As of the 2014–2015 school year, 1,743 students were enrolled and actively attending the school.

Student body
Of the 1743 students enrolled in  2014–2015, Layton High had a minority population of 16.5%, and 23.8% of students were economically disadvantaged.	 Special Education students make up 10% of the student body and the school houses a learning center for students with behavioral disorders.

Notable alumni
 Chuck Ehin - NFL Player
 Shawn William Campbell - NBA Player
 Christine Cavanaugh - voice actress
 Court McGee - wrestler, professional MMA fighter
 Marcus Kemp - NFL Player
 Julian Blackmon - NFL Player
 Neleh Dennis - Survivor Contestant

References

External links

 Layton High School

Public high schools in Utah
Educational institutions established in 1967
Schools in Davis County, Utah